Temple Beth Or (formerly Kahl Montgomery) is a historic reform Jewish congregation in Montgomery, Alabama.

History
Jews in Montgomery first established Chevra Mevacher Cholim, a society to minister to the sick and bury the dead in 1846.  A congregation, named Kahl Montgomery, was formed on May 6, 1849, first meeting in the homes of members, and later renting space on Dexter Avenue.  The congregation drafted an official charter in 1852. In 1858, philanthropist Judah Touro left $2,000 to the congregation to purchase land for a temple.  The temple was completed on March 8, 1862, at the corner of Church and Catoma Streets, and is still standing today serving as the Catoma Street Church of Christ.

By 1870, the congregation had grown considerably, and ritual changes continued to occur. In 1874, the congregation adopted a Reform ritual and modeled it after Temple Emanu El of New York City, and was renamed Temple Beth Or. From 1876 to 1888, Hungarian-born Sigmund Hecht served as the rabbi. He also helped to establish a Sunday school.

In 1902, some more recent Ashkenazi immigrants split off to form Agudath Israel Etz Ahayem.  On June 6, 1902 a new temple at the corner of Sayre and Clayton Streets was dedicated. In 1933 Rabbi Eugene Blachschleger assumed the position of Rabbi.

By the 1960s, the congregation had outgrown their temple once more. They decided to build a new Beth Or in the Cloverdale neighborhood. In 1961 the current house of worship was dedicated.  In 1965 Rabbi David A. Baylinson was elected by the congregation after the untimely death of Rabbi Blachschleger. During Rabbi Baylinson's nearly 30 years with the congregation, Bar and Bat Mitzvah ceremonies were re-instituted and the prayer books Gates of Prayer and Gates of Repentance were introduced. In 1988, the entrance to the sanctuary, the religion school wing, grounds, and social hall were all renovated. Rabbi Baylinson retired in 1994 and was given the title of Rabbi Emeritus.  Rabbi Elliot L. Stevens, held the post from July 2007, until his death in 2017.  Rabbi Scott Looper became the current rabbi in July, 2018.

References

Further reading
Landman, Isaac. "Montgomery", The Universal Jewish Encyclopedia, Universal Jewish Encyclopedia Co. Inc., Volume 7, 1942.

External links 
 

Religious organizations established in 1849
Religious buildings and structures in Montgomery, Alabama
Reform synagogues in Alabama
Synagogues completed in 1961
1849 establishments in Alabama